Iván Tapia (born 23 November 1998) is an Argentine professional footballer who plays as an attacking midfielder for Barracas Central.
He is the son of Claudio Tapia.

Career
Tapia started his career with Barracas Central. He appeared for his senior bow in the 2015 Primera B Metropolitana under manager Marcelo Barrera, coming off the bench at the interval of a 5–4 victory over Deportivo Riestra on 14 November. No appearances followed in the subsequent 2016 season, though he returned in 2016–17 to play fourteen times. Tapia scored his first goal in a 2–2 draw with Defensores de Belgrano in April 2018, with another arriving in February 2019 against Comunicaciones; a match his brother also participated in.

Personal life
Tapia's brother Matías and father Claudio also played football professionally for Barracas Central. His grandfather Hugo Moyano and cousin Facundo Moyano also have a footballing background.

Career statistics
.

Honours
Barracas Central
Primera B Metropolitana: 2018–19

References

External links

1998 births
Living people
Tapia family
Footballers from Buenos Aires
Argentine footballers
Association football midfielders
Primera B Metropolitana players
Barracas Central players